Jope Leka Namawa (born 4 May 1974) is a Fijian footballer who plays as a defender. He has spent his entire career playing for Ba in the National Football League. Between 2001 and 2002, he won six caps and scored one goal for the Fiji national football team.

External links

1974 births
Living people
Fijian footballers
Fiji international footballers
Association football defenders
Ba F.C. players
I-Taukei Fijian people
2002 OFC Nations Cup players